Saint-Gilles is a municipality in the Lotbinière Regional County Municipality in the Chaudière-Appalaches region of Quebec, Canada. Its population was 2,910 as of the Canada 2021 Census.

Name
Saint-Gilles is named after the seigneurie of Saint-Gilles, of which it was part. It was granted in 1738 to Gilles Rageot de Beaurivage (1689-1754), an important merchant from Quebec.

References

Municipalities in Quebec
Incorporated places in Chaudière-Appalaches
Lotbinière Regional County Municipality